Jasmin Rosenberger or  (born October 16, 1985 in Traunstein, Germany) is a Turkish female swimmer competing in the butterfly events. She is a member of Fenerbahçe Swimming in Istanbul. In Germany, she swims for SV Wacker Burghausen, Erster Münchner SC and SG Essen.

Her identical twin sister Iris is also a swimmer. The twins were born to German father Peter Rosenberger and Turkish mother Leyla Aktaş-Rosenberger, a painter, ceramic artist and sculptor, in Traunstein, Germany. They have a younger sister Deniz, who is also a swimmer. Jasmin studied law at the Ludwig Maximilian University of Munich.

Jasmin is the holder of Turkish national records of 200 m butterfly at short course with 2:10.60 set in 2009 and at long course with 2:14.26 set in 2012. She was the member of the Turkish team, which set a new national record at short course in 4×50 m medley relay with 1:53.48.

Achievements

See also
 Turkish women in sports

References

1985 births
Twin sportspeople
Identical twins
Living people
Female butterfly swimmers
Turkish female swimmers
Fenerbahçe swimmers
Ludwig Maximilian University of Munich alumni
German people of Turkish descent
Turkish people of German descent